Grasshopper is a framework to allow the use of Visual Basic and C# applications on a Java application server. It is produced by Mainsoft.

External links 
Mainsoft page on Grasshopper

Programming tools